August Volberg (18 December 1896 Muuksi, Harju County – 21 June 1982 Tallinn) was an Estonian architect and educator.

In 1927 he graduated from Tallinn Technical School. 1950-1960 he worked at the architectural bureau Eesti Projekt. From 1946 until 1954, he worked as a lecturer at the Tallinn Polytechnic Institute. From In 1964 until 1981, he was a lecturer at the Estonian SSR State Art Institute; from 1971, he was the institute's head of the department of architecture.

Awards:
 1956: Estonian SSR merited artistic personnel

Works

 1955: cinema Sõprus (with Peeter Tarvas)
 Pelguranna buildings (with K. Luts)
 1970: Vanemuine Concert Hall (one of the authors)

References

1896 births
1982 deaths
20th-century Estonian architects
Estonian educators
Tallinn University of Technology alumni
Academic staff of the Tallinn University of Technology
Academic staff of the Estonian Academy of Arts
People from Kuusalu Parish